I'm Real is the 54th studio album by American musician James Brown. The album was released in 1988 on Scotti Bros. Records. All of the tracks were produced, written and arranged by Full Force, with the exception of "I'm Real" (co-written by Full Force and Brown) and "It's Your Money $" (written and produced solely by Brown).

Track listing
All tracks composed by James Brown and Full Force; except where indicated

Personnel
James Brown - lead vocals
Full Force (B-Fine (drums), Shy Shy (bass), Paul Anthony (vocals), Bowlegged Lou (vocals), 'Curt-T-T' Bedeau (guitar), Baby Gerry (keyboards)).- music, arrangements, backing vocals
Baby Gerry (Gerard Charles) - scratches
Maceo Parker - saxophone on "You and Me", "She Looks All Types A' Good" and "Keep Keepin'"

References

External links
 Review from People magazine

1988 albums
James Brown albums
Scotti Brothers Records albums